"Love Religion" is a song recorded by German dance music act U96, released in October 1994, as the lead single from their third album, Club Bizarre (1995). Unlike their previous songs, "Love Religion" is more trance-oriented techno and pop. It takes its main melody from Giorgio Moroder's 1978 instrumental "The Chase". The background vocals are performed by Dutch singer, actress and TV host Daisy Dee. It peaked at number two in Finland and Sweden, and was also a top 10 hit in Austria, Denmark, Germany, the Netherlands and Switzerland.

Chart performance
"Love Religion" was a major hit in Europe and remains one of U96's most successful songs to date. It peaked within the top 10 in Austria, Denmark, Finland, Germany, the Netherlands, Sweden and Switzerland. In both Finland and Sweden, the song made it to number two. Additionally, it was a top 20 hit in France, as well as on the Eurochart Hot 100, where the single reached number 12 in December 1994. In Belgium, it was a top 30 hit, while it only reached number 134 in the UK. Outside Europe, "Love Religion" peaked at number 16 in Israel and number 208 in Australia. The single was awarded with a gold record in Germany.

Music video
The accompanying music video for "Love Religion" was directed by German film director and producer Nico Beyer. It was A-listed on Germany's VIVA in November 1994.

Track listings

 12" maxi
 "Love Religion" (E-vangelista Mix) — 6:57  	
 "Love Religion" (Instrumental) — 6:57 	
 "Love Religion" (Vaticano Mix) — 4:05

 CD single
 "Love Religion" (Video Edit)  — 3:35  	
 "Love Religion" (E-vangelista Mix) — 6:57

 CD maxi
 "Love Religion" (Video Edit) — 3:35  	
 "Love Religion" (E-vangelista Mix) — 6:57 	
 "Love Religion" (Vaticano Mix) — 4:05 	
 "Love Religion" (Instrumental) — 6:57

 CD maxi - UK
 "Love Religion" (Video Verses Mix) — 3:35  	
 "Love Religion" (E-vangelista Mix) — 6:57 	
 "Love Religion" (Vaticano Mix) — 5:44 	
 "Love Religion" (Instrumental) — 6:57 	
 "Love Religion" ("Go Berserk" Mix) — 3:35

 CD maxi - Remixes / 12" maxi - Remixes
 "Love Religion" (Perplexer Remix) — 5:24  	
 "Love Religion" (Steve Baltes Remix) — 5:28 	
 "Love Religion" (Exit EEE & Mr Moto Remix) — 6:11 	
 "Love Religion" (Damage Control Remix) — 5:30 	
 "Love Religion" (Yentz Highlight's Mix) — 6:59

Charts

Weekly charts

Year-end charts

References

1994 singles
1994 songs
Daisy Dee songs
English-language German songs
Music videos directed by Nico Beyer
Song recordings produced by Alex Christensen
Songs written by Alex Christensen
Techno songs
U96 songs